Vianex S.A. (Greek: Βιανεξ Α.Ε.) is a Greek pharmaceutical company founded by Pavlos Giannakopoulos and it has been engaged in the pharmaceutical industry since 1924. [1]

With more than 90 years of experience in the field of medicinal products, VIANEX SA performs across a wide range of activities that include the manufacturing, trade, export and distribution of pharmaceuticals for all therapeutic classes.

It operates four specialised manufacturing facilities, with potential for the production of all pharmaceutical forms, while the company also upgrades the range of services it provides through ongoing investment in technological equipment.

VIANEX S.A. holds long term partnership agreements with major multinational pharmaceutical firms, as Merck & Co (USA), Sanofi Pasteur MSD (France) and Takeda Pharmaceutical Company Limited (Japan), etc.

VIANEX SA proceeds yearly to the export of an approximate 60% its production to 56 European countries (United Kingdom, France, Spain, Germany, Denmark, the Netherlands, Cyprus), the Middle East (Jordan, Saudi Arabia), Africa (South Africa, the Ivory Coast) and Asia (China, the Philippines, Japan, Vietnam, Singapore, Taiwan). [2]
 
VIANEX SA has its own research and development department, which is responsible for the formulation of new medicinal products and the development of new pharmaceutical forms, as well as for the improvement of manufacturing and storage methods.

The company undertakes various Corporate Social Responsibility (CSR) activities and supports a number of associations and social welfare organisations active in the healthcare sector. It also works closely with the country’s university clinics and research centres to promote scientific knowledge and the rapid use of research in VIANEX’s production centres for the benefit of the public at large.
 
VIANEX currently employs 1,203 people (in 2019), the majority of whom are highly qualified in the scientific and pharmaceutical sector, while the company constantly invests in their lifelong education and training.

The company showcases robust financial results and every year ranks among the leading pharmaceutical companies in Greece
In 2019, the turnover of the VIANEX Group amounted to 301.3 million euros. [3]

History

The involvement of the Giannakopoulos family in pharmaceuticals began in 1924, with a pharmacy on Peiraios Street. The decisive step was taken by Paul Giannacopoulos in 1960 with the establishment of the company FARMAGIAN, which became a limited company in 1971 and was renamed VIANEX SA.

The manufacturing activity of the company began in 1977 with the establishment of its first factory (Plant A) on the Athens Lamia National Road.
In 1983, the company purchased the Winthrop-Sterling facility in Pallini (Plant B), and in 1985 it also acquired the Upjohn factory in the same area (Plant C). Both facilities have been streamlined and their manufacturing lines were expanded to meet the current standards.

Since then, in parallel with the expansion of its manufacturing base, VIANEX has implemented a programme of technological specialization that advanced the company growth. 
In 1997, VIANEX acquired Hoechst's facilities in Varybobi to house the company’s corporate headquarters and its finished products distribution center.

In 1999, the company acquired an antibiotics production unit, a facility that formerly belonged to the Institute of Pharmaceutical Research & Technology in the Patras Industrial Zone (Plant D). Extensive works to refurbish and upgrade the facility were carried out to ensure compliance with the strictest production standards.

In 1995, the company established the subsidiary company VIAN SA for the purposes of distribution and marketing of well-known non-prescription pharmaceutical products, food supplements, as well as diagnostic and parapharmaceutical products. [4]

In 2011, VIANEX was approved as a regulated supplier by the World Health Organization. [5]
In 2012 the company received a 41% stake from Sfakianakis S.A. after the company stopped vehicle production. [5]

 Another important milestone in the company’s history was the acquisition of the company PHARMANEL in the summer of 2019. [6]

Dimitris P. Giannakopoulos has been the head of the company’s management as the President of BoD and Chief Executive Officer for a number of years now.

Products

The VIANEX product portfolio includes:

Prescription (RX)

Non-Prescription (OTC)

Nutritional Supplements

Infant Nutrition

Diagnostics

Cosmetics

CORPORATE SOCIAL RESPONSIBILITY

The philosophy of VIANEX is that every company with a sense of responsibility is aware that all of its actions are inevitably connected to society, to people, the environment and to cultural experience. Following this philosophy, VIANEX has implemented various CSR activities throughout its history, that include the respect for human rights and the environment, the enhancement of healthcare and the support of the Greek society.

VIANEX has established a responsible corporate governance for its operation that ensures that the company complies with legislation, regulations and international best practices and standards. Product quality and safety are at the forefront of the company’s operation.

VIANEX also invests in human capital to maximize the efficiency in production and the quality of the products and services it provides.

In collaboration with engineers, researchers and expert scientists, the company gradually designs and implements systems and processes, and proceeds to investments based on the latest technological and scientific developments. This enables the company to minimize its environmental impact, save resources and reduce its energy footprint.
VIANEX actively supports a variety of programmes, initiatives and campaigns with a positive impact on the society, offering various sponsorships and donations to vulnerable social groups, institutions and non-governmental organisations, always in compliance to the Code of Pharmaceutical Ethics.

VIANEX is an ambassador for sustainable development and a member of many organisations that are committed to promoting sustainability and responsible entrepreneurship. [7]

VE-20316

[1] www.vianex.gr
[2] https://www.vianex.gr/ergo/sub-eksagwges 
[3]  https://www.vianex.gr/financial
[4] https://www.vian.gr/el/
[5] https://www.vianex.gr/etairia
[6] https://www.capital.gr/epixeiriseis/3369318/exagora-tis-farmanel-apo-ti-bianex
 [7] https://www.vianex.gr/etairia/sub-eke

References

Greek brands
Pharmaceutical companies of Greece
Greek companies established in 1971
Pharmaceutical companies established in 1971